Alexz can be a variation of the name Alexzandra, or several other similar names. Notable people with the given name or nickname include:

Alexz Johnson (born 1986), Canadian singer-songwriter, record producer, actress, and philanthropist
Alexz Wigg (born 1989), English international motorcycle trials rider

See also
Alex